is a railway station in the city of Seto, Aichi Prefecture,  Japan, operated by Meitetsu.

Lines

Station layout
The station has a single island platform. The station has automated ticket machines, Manaca automated turnstiles and is staffed.

Adjacent stations

|-
!colspan=5|Nagoya Railroad

Station history
It was renamed to its present name on February 19, 1921. The Seto Electric Railway was absorbed into the Meitetsu group on September 1, 1939. A new station building was completed in April 2001.

Passenger statistics
In fiscal 2017, the station was used by an average of 4423 passengers daily.

Surrounding area
Seto City Art Museum

See also
 List of Railway Stations in Japan

References

External links

 Official web page 

Railway stations in Japan opened in 1905
Railway stations in Aichi Prefecture
Stations of Nagoya Railroad
Seto, Aichi